The Latin Archbishopric of Corinth is a titular see of the Roman Catholic Church. It dates to 1210, when a Catholic archbishop was installed on the Orthodox Metropolis of Corinth, in southern Greece, in the aftermath of the Fourth Crusade. Since the Byzantine reconquest in the early 15th century, and except for a brief period of Venetian rule in 1688–1715, it has been awarded as a titular see. It has been vacant since 2005.

History
The See of Corinth has a long history, and is held to have been founded by the Apostle Paul. In the Roman and early Byzantine periods, Corinth was the capital and metropolitan see of the province of Achaea (southern Greece). From the early 9th century, however, the primacy of Corinth over the Peloponnese was challenged by the See of Patras, and from the 10th century on the jurisdiction of the See of Corinth was restricted to the eastern Peloponnese and certain of the Ionian Islands.

In 1203/4, the city fell to the lord of the Argolid, Leo Sgouros, who used the weakness of the Byzantine government and the turmoil of the Fourth Crusade to carve out for himself a practically independent state in southern and central Greece. Sgouros' ambitions to create a state of his own were checked by the onslaught of the victorious Crusaders, who captured Corinth in 1210 after a long siege. 

The Crusaders established a Roman Catholic ("Latin") Archbishopric to replace the Greek Orthodox see, covering the same territory: the seven suffragan sees of Cephalonia, Zakynthos, Damala, Lacedaemon/Monemvasia, Argos, Helos and Zemena. In reality, Monemvasia and Helos were not to come under Latin control until thirty years later, and the Latin clergy had difficulty imposing itself on the rural Greek population and priesthood. As a result, the sees of Damala, Helos and Zemena seem to have never been occupied, and Zemena and one half of Damala came to form part of the diocese of Corinth itself. Along with its rival, the Latin Archbishop of Patras, the Archbishop of Corinth ranked as one of the two senior ecclesiastic barons in the Principality of Achaea, with eight knight's fiefs attached to him (and four each for the suffragan bishops of Argos and Lacedaemon). Nevertheless, despite its ancestry and prestige, Corinth was rapidly eclipsed by Patras during the period of Frankish rule.

Le Quien (III, 883) mentions twenty Latin prelates from 1210 to 1700, but Eubel (I, 218; II, 152) mentions twenty-two archbishops for the period from 1212 to 1476. The city was recovered by the Byzantine Despotate of the Morea in 1395, and, after a short period (1397–1404) of rule by the Knights Hospitaller, returned to Byzantine hands, where it remained until it fell to the Ottoman Empire on 8 August 1458. After this the Catholic see remained as a titular see.

The Archbishopric of Corinth became once more the centre of the Catholic Church in the Peloponnese during the brief period of Venetian rule in 1688–1715, while the Orthodox Metropolis of Patras remained the centre of the local Orthodox Church.

Residential archbishops

Titular archbishops

References

Sources
 
 
 
 
 Pius Bonifacius Gams, Series episcoporum Ecclesiae Catholicae, Leipzig 1931, pp. 430-431
 Konrad Eubel, Hierarchia Catholica Medii Aevi, vol. 1 , p. 210; vol. 2, p. 136; vol. 3 , p. 178; vol. 4, pp. 164-165; vol. 5, p. 173; vol. 6, p. 183
"Corinthe", in Dictionnaire d'Histoire et de Géographie ecclésiastiques, vol. XIII, Paris 1956, coll. 876-880

External links 
Corinthus, at catholic-hierarchy.org

 
Catholic titular sees in Europe
Corinth
Baronies of the Principality of Achaea
Former Roman Catholic dioceses in Greece
Latin Archbishopric of Corinth
Latin Archbishopric of Corinth
1210 establishments in Europe
Corinth